Haliplus alluaudi is a species of Haliplidae in the genus Haliplus. It was discovered in 1903. The species lives in the Afro-tropical region.

References

Haliplidae
Beetles described in 1903
Beetles of Africa